The service mark symbol  (the letters  in small capitals and superscript style), is a symbol used in the United States and some other jurisdictions to provide notice that the preceding mark is a service mark. This symbol may be used for service marks not yet registered with the relevant national authority. Upon successful registration, registered services are marked with the same symbol as is used for registered trademarks, the registered trademark symbol . The proper manner to display the symbol is immediately following the service name, in superscript style.

Computer systems

The HTML entity is &#8480;.

Unlike the similar trademark symbol, there is no simple way to type the service mark symbol on Microsoft Windows or Apple MacOS systems. However the symbol may be selected from the Windows Character Map or the MacOS Character Palette. On Linux and similar systems with a Compose key, it can be inserted using .

Related symbols
 Registered trademark symbol is also used for registered service marks
 Trademark symbol

See also
 World Intellectual Property Organization

References

United States trademark law
Services marketing
Typographical symbols